Johnny, You're Wanted is a British television series which originally aired on BBC in 6 episodes between 7 November and 12 December 1953. In 1956 it was adapted into a film of the same title also starring Slater.

Cast
 John Slater as Johnny (6 episodes)
 Joan Newell as  Joan (6 episodes) 
 Tom Clegg as Trunker (5 episodes) 
 Herbert Smith as  Old Moore (4 episodes) 
 Theodore Bikel as Ferrari (4 episodes) 
 Martin Wyldeck as  Inspector Markham (4 episodes)
 John Boulter as  Detective Sergeant (4 episodes)
 Elspet Gray as  Beryl (3 episodes) 
 Joan Young as Matron (3 episodes)
 William Franklyn as Dr. Matthews (3 episodes)
 Jack Newmark as  Solomon (3 episodes)
 Diana Graves as  Sonia (2 episodes)
 Frank Hawkins as 	 Mac (2 episodes)
 Lind Joyce as 	 Cabaret Singer (2 episodes)
 Frederick Wheldon as 	 Maitre d'Hotel (2 episodes)
 Arthur Lovegrove as 	 Sid (1 episode)
 Jacqueline Squire as  Peggy (1 episode)
 Reginald Hearne as  Police Sergeant (1 episode)
 Kenneth Cope as  Police Constable (1 episode)
 John Vere as Tobacconist (1 episode)
 Olivia Burleigh as  Lady Stoke 1 episode)
 Noel Davis as  Motor Mechanic (1 episode)
 Alec Finter asStage-Door Keeper (1 episode)

References

Bibliography
Baskin, Ellen . Serials on British Television, 1950-1994. Scolar Press, 1996.

External links
 

BBC television dramas
1953 British television series debuts
1953 British television series endings
English-language television shows